is a 2008 Japanese film directed by Ryōsuke Hashiguchi and starring Lily Franky and Tae Kimura.

Cast
Lily Franky
Tae Kimura
Mitsuko Baisho
Susumu Terajima
Tamae Ando
Minori Terada
Akira Emoto
Norito Yashima
Seiichi Tanabe
Ryo Kase
Reiko Kataoka
Hirofumi Arai

Reception
Todd Brown of Twitch Film called All Around Us "[a]t once sweepingly panoramic and microscopically intimate", adding that "Hashiguchi's fourth feature parallels the pains and struggles of the married couple at its center with the changes in Japan itself, touching on such major events as the 1990s economic collapse, the 1995 Tokyo subway sarin gas attacks, and others."

Awards and nominations
51st Blue Ribbon Awards
 Won: Best Actress - Tae Kimura
 Won: Best New Talent - Lily Franky
33rd Hochi Film Award 
 Won: Best Director - Ryōsuke Hashiguchi
32nd Japan Academy Prize: Best Actress (Tae Kimura)

References

External links
 

2008 films
Films directed by Ryōsuke Hashiguchi
Japanese drama films
2000s Japanese films
2000s Japanese-language films